Vestbygda Chapel is a parish church of the Church of Norway in Farsund Municipality in Agder county, Norway. It is located in the village of Vestbygd. It is one of the two churches for the Lista parish which is part of the Lister og Mandal prosti (deanery) in the Diocese of Agder og Telemark. The white, wooden church was built in a long church design in 1909 using plans drawn up by the architect D.J. Meberg. The church seats about 320 people.

Media gallery

See also
List of churches in Agder og Telemark

References

Farsund
Churches in Agder
Wooden churches in Norway
20th-century Church of Norway church buildings
Churches completed in 1909
1909 establishments in Norway